Citibank National Association, United Arab Emirates commonly known as Citibank U.A.E., is a franchise subsidiary of Citigroup, a multinational financial services corporation headquartered in New York City, United States. Citi U.A.E. is connected by a network spanning 98 markets across the world. The phone support call center for Citibank U.A.E. retail banking clients is based at Citibank Bahrain.

History
Established in 1964, when the Citibank U.A.E., opened its first branch in Dubai. A second branch in Abu Dhabi was opened in 1971.

Branches
Citibank U.A.E. has full service branches in only three of the seven Emirates, Abu Dhabi, Dubai and Sharjah.

Products and services
Citibank U.A.E. offers consumers and institutions a range of financial products and services, including consumer banking and credit; corporate and investment banking; institutional equity research and sales; foreign exchange, credit cards, commercial banking; and treasury and trade solutions and an E-Brokerage.

Bank account requirements
Since 2015, Citibank U.A.E. requires new retail banking clients to maintain 35,000 AED, or multi-currency AED equivalent minimum balance for a basic current/checking account with a debit card.

Online brokerage
The Dubai International Financial Centre (DIFC) domiciled, Citibank U.A.E. E-Brokerage for DIY Investors. charges 1% of traded amount per transaction and 0.2% custody fees per year, calculated on the average balance of assets under custody and charged quarterly. This fee structure is considered very competitive in the UAE market.

Capital Markets & Investment Banking Operations
In Dubai, operations are based at Dubai International Financial Centre (DIFC) licensed under Citigroup Global Markets Ltd. and Citibank, N.A. (DIFC Branch), started in 2006.

In Abu Dhabi, operations are based at Abu Dhabi Global Market (ADGM), licensed under Citibank N.A., started in 2018.

Offshore booking center
Citibank U.A.E. is also used an offshore booking center for loans, and other products, for tax efficiency purposes.

Digital wallet support
Citibank U.A.E. used to support their own Citi Pay digital wallet for their debit and credit cards. This mobile wallet was discontinued on 30 June 2019. Samsung Pay and Google Pay are not supported. Apple Pay is supported on Mastercard Credit Cards only and was rolled out on 15th September 2020.

Multi-factor authentication
Security options available include: Citi Mobile® Token with Citi Mobile® App to authenticate all, transactions, replacing One-Time Passwords (OTP) via SMS. Which is paired with a mobile device. 
However Citi Mobile® Token token activation requires the less secure SMS one-time PIN messages sent to registered mobile numbers. And fallback to SMS OTP is still available even after Citi Mobile® Token token is activated.

See also
List of banks in the United Arab Emirates

References

External links

Citibank N.A., United Arab Emirates website

Citigroup
Banks of the United Arab Emirates
Companies based in Abu Dhabi
Companies based in Dubai
Companies based in the Emirate of Sharjah
Online brokerages
Emirati companies established in 1964
Banks established in 1964